Yasmin Bilkis Sathi is a Bangladeshi model, beauty pageant titleholder and actress who was crowned Miss Bangladesh 1995 and represented Bangladesh at Miss World 1995. She also received Bangladesh National Film Award for Best Supporting Actress in 2003 for Bir Soinik.

Biography
After crowning Miss Bangladesh in 1995 Yasmin Bilkis Sathi acted in Pordeshi Babu which was released in 1999. She acted in Bir Soinik in 2003 and for this film she received National Film Award. She also acted in Aha! in 2008.

Selected filmography
 Pordeshi Babu
 Abbajan
 Bir Soinik
 Onyayer Protishodh
 Boro Malik
 Aha!

Awards and nominations

References

Bangladeshi beauty pageant winners
Bangladeshi female models
Living people
Miss World 1995 delegates
Bangladeshi film actresses
Best Supporting Actress National Film Award (Bangladesh) winners
Year of birth missing (living people)